= Thomas William Pearce =

The Reverend Thomas William Pearce

Thomas William Pearce (1855–1938) was an English missionary of the London Missionary Society in China.

Pearce arrived at Canton in 1879, and was connected with missionary work there until 1893, when was transferred to Hong Kong. He received an O.B.E. for his services as one of a committee of five responsible for the revision of the Chinese Bible. He was also one of the first to receive the degree of L.L.D. from Hong King University. He died at Withycombe, Exmouth, in 1938, aged 83.
